Gold Shadow is the second solo studio album of Israeli artist Asaf Avidan after his first album entitled Different Pulses. The album containing 12 tracks was released on 12 January 2015 in Israel on Telmavar Records and in Europe on Polydor-Universal Music and on iTunes and Amazon on January 22, 2015.

Track list
"Over My Head" (2:37)	
"Ode to My Thalamus" (3:38)	
"The Jail That Sets You Free" (3:18)	
"Little Parcels of an Endless Time" (3:25)	
"My Tunnels Are Long and Dark These Days" (4:32)	
"Gold Shadow" (4:30)	
"Let's Just Call It Fate" (3:12)	
"These Words You Want to Hear" (3:27)	
"A Part of This" (3:42)	
"Bang Bang" (3:23)	
"The Labyrinth Song" (4:08)	
"Fair Haired Traveller" (4:11)

Charts

Weekly charts

Year-end charts

References

2015 albums